Anything Goes is the second studio album by American country music duo Florida Georgia Line. It was released on October 14, 2014, by Republic Nashville. The release of the album was announced August 15 from Central Park in New York City on Good Morning America. The album was produced by Joey Moi. Its first single, "Dirt", became Florida Georgia Line's sixth number one hit when it peaked at number one on the Billboard Hot Country Songs chart.

Critical reception
Anything Goes has received mixed reviews from critics.  Writing for Allmusic, Stephen Thomas Erlewine criticized the anonymity of the duo and their music, claiming that "they're playing to the largest possible audience, so nobody should be surprised that Anything Goes is so broad it avoids such messiness as personality."  He awarded the album 3 stars out of 5.  Tom Roland awarded the album 4 out of 5 stars in his review for Billboard, saying that "it shores up the duo's country flanks, and demonstrates that FGL intends to aggressively protect its progressive place in the genre, one that the act essentially designed on its own."

Commercial performance
The album debuted at number one on the Billboard 200 with first-week sales of 197,000 copies.  The album was certified Gold by the RIAA on December 1, 2014, and Platinum on March 29, 2016, for combined sales and streams of a million units. As of June 2015, the album has sold 858,000 copies in the US.

It also reached number one on the Top Country Albums chart.

In Canada, the album debuted at number two on the Canadian Albums Chart, selling 16,000 copies.

Singles

"Dirt" was released as the lead single from the album on July 8, 2014. A huge commercial success, it peaked at number one on both the Hot Country Songs and Country Airplay charts. It also peaked at number 11 on the Billboard Hot 100.

"Sun Daze" was released as the second single on September 16, 2014, and peaked at number one on the Country Airplay chart. It also peaked at number 44 on the Hot 100.

"Sippin' on Fire" was released as the third single on February 16, 2015, and peaked at number one on the Country Airplay chart. It also peaked at number 40 on the Hot 100.

"Anything Goes" was released as the fourth single on June 15, 2015, and peaked at number three on the Country Airplay chart. It also peaked at number 55 on the Hot 100.

"Confession" was released as the fifth and final single from the album on November 3, 2015, and peaked at number one on the Country Airplay chart. It also peaked at number 53 on the Hot 100.

Track listing
The album's track listing was announced on August 15.

Personnel

Florida Georgia Line
 Tyler Hubbard – vocals
 Brian Kelley – vocals

Additional Musicians
 Tom Bukovac – electric guitar
 Sarah Buxton – background vocals
 Rodney Clawson – background vocals
 Wes Hightower – background vocals
 Charlie Judge – keyboards
 Joey Moi – acoustic guitar, electric guitar, percussion, background vocals, whistle
 Russ Pahl – pedal steel guitar
 Danny Rader – bouzouki, acoustic guitar, mandolin
 Adam Shoenfeld – electric guitar
 Jimmie Lee Sloas – bass guitar
 Bryan Sutton – banjo, bouzouki, acoustic guitar, dobro, mandolin
 Chris Tompkins – acoustic guitar, keyboards, percussion, background vocals
 Ilya Toshinsky – banjo, dobro, acoustic guitar, electric guitar

Charts and certifications

Weekly charts

Year-end charts

Decade-end charts

Singles

Certifications

Other charted songs

References

2014 albums
Florida Georgia Line albums
Republic Records albums
Albums produced by Joey Moi